Ridgeway is an unincorporated community in Pleasant Hill Township, Winona County, Minnesota, United States.

The community is located near the junction of Winona County Roads 11, 12, and 104.

Interstate 90 and State Highway 76 (MN 76) are nearby.  ZIP codes 55987 (Winona), 55943 (Houston), and 55925 (Dakota) all meet near Ridgeway.

Nearby places include Winona, Houston, Dakota, Witoka, Lamoille, Nodine, and New Hartford Township.

References

Unincorporated communities in Minnesota
Unincorporated communities in Winona County, Minnesota